Cicero Township may refer to the following townships in the United States:

 Cicero Township, Cook County, Illinois
 Cicero Township, Tipton County, Indiana